Team Illuminate may refer to:

Team Illuminate (men's team), a professional cycling team that competes on the UCI Continental Tours
Team Illuminate (women's team), a professional cycling team that competes on the UCI Women's World Tour